Jon Jon Park (born 21 February 1957) is a British former swimmer. He competed in the men's 100 metre butterfly at the 1976 Summer Olympics. He also won several bodybuilding titles, including Mr. South Africa Maccabiah and Mr. Golden City.

He was born in Johannesburg, South Africa; his father is former Mr. Universe Reg Park.

References

External links
 

1957 births
Living people
British male swimmers
Olympic swimmers of Great Britain
Swimmers at the 1976 Summer Olympics
Swimmers from Johannesburg